David Kenneth Popejoy (born 15 February 1972) is a retired American hammer thrower.

He competed at the 1996 Olympic Games and the 1997 World Championships without reaching the final. He competed alongside his closest friend Kevin McMahon, who competed in both the 1996 Olympics and the 2000 Olympic Games.

His personal best throw was 74.26 metres, achieved in June 1996 in Atlanta.

References

1972 births
Living people
American male hammer throwers
Athletes (track and field) at the 1996 Summer Olympics
Olympic track and field athletes of the United States